The Auto Mobil International (AMI Leipzig), also known as Leipzig Auto Show, is the first motor show organized by the Leipziger Messe since 1991, in Leipzig, Germany. Spring 1991 saw the first car show in eastern Germany following the country’s reunification, the previous year. Featuring 273 exhibitors, it drew 113,402 visitors. Auto Mobil International has evolved as a top annual European exhibition attracting more than 400 exhibitors from 20 countries and around 270,000 visitors from 50 nations. In addition to the IAA in Frankfurt, which takes place every two years, it is the second largest German car show. AMI introduced many innovations in the automotive sector, including over 100 world, European and Germany premieres. Since 2010 the show is held every two years. 

Parallel to the AMI is AMITEC, a trade fair for vehicle components, workshops and services.

2012
This year, the AMI (Auto Mobil International) in Leipzig is Germany's only international motor show. It owes its status to the agreed rotation, due to which it takes place with the IAA in Frankfurt, every second year. Accordingly, the contingent of exhibitors is high and brands such as Rolls-Royce or Tesla even made their debut at the AMI. Overall, more than 80 premieres await visitors, including 20 world and European premieres. 450 companies and brands from 23 countries join the exhibition centre in Leipzig.

 Audi Q5
 Audi Q5 Hybrid 
 BMW 114i
 BMW 3 Series M Performance Parts
 BMW 328i Touring
 BMW 330d Touring
 BMW 520d Gran Turismo Individual
 BMW 640d Gran Coupe Individual
 BMW M135i 
 BMW M550d xDrive Touring
 BMW X6 M50d
 BT Design ETAPE Concept
 Honda CBR600F LCR Edition
 Mazda MX-5 Roadster "Yusho" Concept
 Volkswagen Beetle "Fender Edition"
 Volkswagen CC R-Line
 Volkswagen CrossPolo "Urban White"
 Volkswagen Scirocco GTS 
 Volvo XC60 Inscription

2010
 Audi A3
 Audi Q7  
 Audi TT (facelift)
 BMW 5 Series Touring 
 Chevrolet Cruze Irmscher Edition 
 Ford Focus RS500 
 Volkswagen Touran

2009
 Audi TT-RS Roadster 
 Chevrolet HHR "Capone"
 Ford Mondeo LPG
 Ford C-Max LPG
 Mercedes-Benz E-Klasse Taxi 
 Peugeot 206+
 Volkswagen T5 California Beach Cape2Cape 
 Volkswagen Golf GTD
 Volkswagen Golf Plus BiFuel

2005
 Audi A4 DTM Edition
 Volkswagen Polo 
 Volkswagen Fox

2004
 Opel Combo Tour 1.6 CNG Prototype

External links

References

Auto shows in Germany
Events in Leipzig
1991 establishments in Germany
Recurring events established in 1991